Chickpea salad, sometimes called hummus salad, using the Arabic word for 'chickpea', is a salad in Arab cuisine. It consists of whole cooked chickpeas, lemon juice, garlic, tahini, salt, olive oil, and cumin.

Variants may include coriander, sweet paprika, turmeric, pepper, chopped mint, chopped onions, or parsley.

Chickpea salad is eaten by vegans worldwide.

See also
 List of Arab salads
 List of salads

References

Arab cuisine
Salads